The Thailand women's national field hockey team represents Thailand in international field hockey competitions.

Tournament record

Asian Games
1986 – 5th
1998 – 7th
2010 – 6th
2014 – 7th
2018 – 6th
2022 – Qualified

Asia Cup
1985 – 5th
1993 – 7th
2007 – 6th
2009 – 10th
2017 – 6th
2022 – 6th

AHF Cup
2003 – 5th
2012 – 
2016 –

Asian Champions Trophy
2021 – 4th

Hockey World League
2014–15 – 24th
2016–17 – 27th

See also
Thailand men's national field hockey team

References

External links
Official website
FIH profile

Asian women's national field hockey teams
Field hockey
National team